Mammillaria magnimamma, common name Mexican pincushion, is a species of flowering plant in the cactus family Cactaceae.

Description
Mammillaria magnimamma  is a perennial globose plant reaching a height of 15–30 cm and a diameter of about 13 cm. At first it grows solitary, but later forms large clumps rising above ground level. Tubercules are four-sided, with latex and the axils have dense white wool. Flowers are pink or white cream with reddish midveins and a diameter of 20 – 25 mm. They bloom in mid Spring. Fruits are club shaped, dark red, about 20 mm long, and contain little brown seeds.

Distribution
Its status is listed as “Least Concern” by the IUCN Red List.

Cultivation
It needs to be grown in a well-drained medium in full sun. It has gained the Royal Horticultural Society’s Award of Garden Merit.

Gallery

References

External links
 Mallillarias.net
 N. L. Britton, J. N. Rose: The Cactaceae. Descriptions and Illustrations of Plants of the Cactus Family. Band IV, The Carnegie Institution of Washington, Washington 1923, S. 41
 Guide
 Desert -tropical

magnimamma